The Hundred of Sydney is a former lands administrative division for the city of Sydney and its inner suburbs. It was one of the thirteen hundreds in the County of Cumberland, which were published in the government gazette of May 27, 1835, and repealed on January 21, 1888. It included nine parishes (more than any other hundred); the four small parishes in the Sydney city area: St Andrew, St James, St Lawrence and  St Philip, as well as five larger parishes further away from the city: Concord, Petersham, Alexandria, Botany and St George. Its boundaries were the Parramatta River/Sydney Harbour to the north, Botany Bay/Georges River to the south, while the western boundary included part of Haslams Creek (formerly Hacking Creek) and Salt Pan Creek.

The area occupied by the former Hundred of Sydney corresponds with the customary Sydney regions of the Eastern Suburbs, South-Eastern Sydney, Inner West and St George, as well as the inner city of Sydney.

Administratively, the area roughly corresponds with the modern Local Government Areas of the Municipality of Woollahra, Waverley Council, City of Randwick, City of Sydney,  Inner West Council, Municipality of Burwood, Municipality of Strathfield, City of Canada Bay, Bayside Council, Georges River Council and the eastern part of the City of Canterbury-Bankstown (which was formerly City of Canterbury).

References
The Parish Map, Board of Surveying and Spatial Information of New South Wales
A map of the County of Cumberland in the Colony of New South Wales, 1840. National Library of Australia MAP F 263.
A map of the County of Cumberland in the colony of New South Wales 1848. National Library of Australia MAP F 104

History of Sydney